The 1916 Maryland State Aggies football team was an American football team that represented Maryland State College (which in 1920 became part of the University of Maryland) in the 1916 college football season. In their sixth season under head coach Curley Byrd, the Aggies compiled a 6–2 record and outscored opponents by a total of 142 to 52.

Lyman Oberlin was the team captain.

Schedule

References

Maryland State
Maryland Terrapins football seasons
Maryland State Aggies football